The 1982 Cal Poly Mustangs football team represented California Polytechnic State University, San Luis Obispo as a member of the  Western Football Conference (WFC) during the 1982 NCAA Division II football season. Led by first-year head coach Jim Sanderson, Cal Poly compiled an overall record of 6–5 with a mark of 4–0 in conference play, winning the WFC title. The Mustangs played home games at Mustang Stadium in San Luis Obispo, California.

1982 was the first season for the Western Football Conference. In its initial season, the WFC had five teams. Three of them were the final members of the California Collegiate Athletic Association (CCAA): Cal State Northridge, Cal Poly Pomona, and Cal Poly. They were joined by Santa Clara and Portland State.

Schedule

References

Cal Poly
Cal Poly Mustangs football seasons
Western Football Conference champion seasons
Cal Poly Mustangs football